"Prayin'" is a song written by Alan Earls from Greystones, County Wicklow and recorded by Australian-born Irish singer and composer Johnny Logan. The song was released in association with RTÉ's music entertainment series The Hit. The song peaked at number 3 on the Irish charts and number 1 on the Irish rock chart. 

Following the chart position, Logan spoke to the Irish Independent saying "For a person who has been around as long as I have, this is incredible. I feel like the singer Bill Nighy plays in the film Love Actually, the guy who tops the charts by accident."

Reception
Padraig Muldoon from WiwiBloggs said “"Prayin'" is completely different to his previous work. It's an anthemic rock song, which you could easily imagine being performed to a packed stadium. After a few listens it's very hard not to sing along. And despite its somber themes of death and loss it is oddly uplifting.”

Track listing

Charts

References

2013 singles
2013 songs
Johnny Logan (singer) songs